Party of Law and Justice, previously named Party of the Socio-Economic Justice of Moldova (Romanian: Partidul Dreptății Social-Economice din Moldova) is a Christian-democrat political party from Moldova, led by Nicolae Alexei.
At the last legislative elections, 6 March 2005, the party won 1.7% of the popular vote, but no seats.

References

External links
https://web.archive.org/web/20060521034239/http://www.alegeri2005.md/opponents/pdsem/program/

Political parties in Moldova